Austryn Wainhouse (6 February 1927 – 29 September 2014) was an American author, publisher and translator, primarily of French works and most notably of the Marquis de Sade.  He sometimes used the pseudonym Pieralessandro Casavini.

Life
Following his graduation from Harvard University, Wainhouse traveled around Europe before settling in Paris where he worked for Maurice Girodias at Olympia Press. His wife Mary, known as Muffy or Muffie, also worked for Girodias.  They divorced in 1959.

In 1960, some time after Wainhouse had returned to the United States, Gay Talese described him as

Wainhouse and his wife, Deborah Clayton Wainhouse, returned to the south of France in 2001, where he lived until his death in September 2014.

Career
In the early 1950s, Wainhouse worked for Maurice Girodias at Olympia Press in Paris, and later was an editor of the short-lived literary magazine Merlin.

Wainhouse produced the first unexpurgated English translation of the Marquis de Sade's Justine for Olympia Press in 1953.  In 1955 the controversial erotic French novel Histoire d'O (Story of O) by Pauline Reage (a pseudonym for Anne Desclos), won the prestigious Prix des Deux Magots award for unconventional books. Wainhouse was hired to provide a second translation. In order to thwart the censors and protect the author and translator, Girodias changed the title to The Wisdom of the Lash.

After his return to the United States, Wainhouse embarked on a translation of Sade's entire oeuvre for Grove Press, including Justine, The 120 Days of Sodom, and Letters from the Bastille.  The translation was well-received, with one reviewer calling it "appropriately and agreeably prolix."

In 1970 Wainhouse was Writer-in-Residence at the Jonas Salk Institute, and in 1972 he won the National Book Award in category Translation for Jacques Monod's Chance and Necessity (NY: Vintage, 1971).

By 1983, he had established his own publishing firm The Marlboro Press in Marlboro, Vermont, which specialized in translations of works into English, such as Louis Calaferte's C'est la Guerre and Georges Hyvernaud's Skin and Bones.  His wife Deborah Clayton Wainhouse was director of the press.

Wainhouse was friends for many years with British poet Christopher Logue, with whom he carried on a lively correspondence for decades.

Bibliography

Original work 
 Hedyphagetica, 1954  in Paris
 On Translating Sade, 1966, Evergreen Review

Translations 

 1953: Marquis de Sade's Justine , reprinted in 1963 as #67 in Traveller's Companion series.
 1955: Georges Bataille, Lascaux; or, the Birth of Art, the Prehistoric Paintings and Manet, co-translator James Emmons
 1958: Simone de Beauvoir, The Long March
 1968: Marquis de Sade, Juliette (1797)
 1971: Jacques Monod, Chance and Necessity, New York: Vintage, 1971
 1989: Georges Bataille, My Mother, Madame Edwarda, The Dead Man, with essays by Yukio Mishima and Ken Hollings, Marion Boyars Publishers.
 1996: Aleksandra Kroh, Lucien's Story 
 2002: Pierre Klossowski, Roberte ce Soir and Revocation of the Edict of Nantes, with introduction by Michael Perkins, published by Dalkey Archive Press

References

External links 
 Austryn Wainhouse Papers at Syracuse University Special Collections Research Center
 The Marquis de Sade in English 1950 - 1959
 Austryn Wainhouse at Library of Congress Authorities—with 8 catalog records

 

French–English translators
National Book Award winners
Harvard University alumni
University of Iowa alumni
2014 deaths
Place of birth missing
1927 births
20th-century translators
20th-century American novelists
American male novelists
20th-century American male writers